Reuben Asberry Jr., better known by the stage name Kennedy Davenport (born September 9, 1980), is a drag queen, television personality, and dancer from Dallas, Texas, who came to international attention on the seventh season of RuPaul's Drag Race, placing fourth overall, and on the third season of RuPaul's Drag Race All Stars, where she was the runner-up.

Career 
Davenport first appeared on television in the eighth season of America's Got Talent in 2013. She was eliminated in the Vegas round.

She was announced as one of the fourteen contestants in season seven of RuPaul's Drag Race on March 2, 2015, where she placed fourth overall. After this, she made a one-episode appearance on Skin Wars with fellow Drag Race contestants. On October 20, 2017, Davenport was announced as one of the returning queens for RuPaul's Drag Race All Stars 3. Davenport ultimately was the runner-up overall, losing to Trixie Mattel.

Outside of Drag Race, Asberry has won numerous titles in drag pageants, including Miss Gay Orlando 2016, Miss D’Elegance International 2013, and Miss Gay Black USofA 2009. Her dance performances are her signature component.

Davenport also works as a musician; she released her first single, "Moving Up", featuring rapper Dresia Dee on March 16, 2018.

In July 2020, she returned to the fifth season of RuPaul's Drag Race All Stars as a Lip-Sync Assassin. She lip-synced against Miz Cracker to Fancy by Reba McEntire but lost.

Personal life 
Asberry was born to Checkery Marie Thacker. His father, Reuben Asberry Sr., died on October 25, 2013. Prior to pursuing drag, he spent some time in the United States Navy.

A $33,000 bank payment was needed to prevent his house from being foreclosed upon. A GoFundMe page was created to help pay off the house note, and a drag event was held to support him, featuring fellow Drag Race alumni.

His drag mother is Kelexis Davenport, who is also drag mother to the late season 2 Drag Race contestant Sahara Davenport. Another one of Kennedy's drag sisters, Bianca Gisele Davenport Starr, was murdered on December 8, 2017. Drag Race season 11 contestant A'keria C. Davenport, and other Drag Race 
Contestants throughout the years (Honey Davenport, Monét X Change and Ra'Jah O'Hara) are among members of the Davenport drag family.

Pageant history 
 Miss Gay Black USofA 2009
 Miss Tampa Bay International 2009
 Miss Glamorous 2010
 North Carolina All American Goddess 2010
 Miss Parliament House 2010
 Miss Revolution 2010
 Miss Treasure Coast 2010
 Miss Gay South Central States USofA 2011
 Miss Parliament House 2011
 Miss Gay Georgia USofA 2012
 Miss Texas FFI 2012
 Mid America All American Goddess 2013
 All American Goddess (3rd Alternate)
 Miss D’Elegance International 2013
 Miss Gay Orlando 2016
 Miss West Palm Beach International 2016
 Miss Gay Texas USofA 2017 (1st Alternate)
 Miss Gay USofA 2017 (1st Alternate)
Miss Gay USofA 2019
 Miss Pride South Florida 2019

Filmography

Film

Television

Music videos

Web series

Theatre

Discography

Singles

As featured artist

Other appearances

References

External links

 

1982 births
Living people
American drag queens
African-American drag queens
People from Dallas
Kennedy Davenport
LGBT people from Texas
LGBT African Americans
Gay entertainers
Kennedy Davenport